Raghavapatnam is a village in Rowthulapudi Mandal, Kakinada district in the state of Andhra Pradesh in India.

Geography 

Demographics 
Raghavapatnam village has a population of 1211, of which 647 are male and 564 are female. The population of children below 6 years of age is 112. The literacy rate of the village is 48.41%.

References 

Villages in Rowthulapudi mandal